Kushtrim Mushica (Serbian: Kuštrim Mušica) (born 1 May 1983) is a Kosovar professional footballer.

Club career

Early career
Mushica was born in Pristina, SR Serbia, in modern-day Kosovo, which was part of Yugoslavia at the time, he began playing football in 1991 with local side KF Ramiz Sadiku at the age of 6. He remained at the club until the Kosovo War led him to move away to Turkey at the age of 14 to live with relatives for three months while his father and older brother remained in Prishtinë. He returned to his hometown once his father deemed Prishtinë to be reasonably safe, and soon after the NATO bombing of Yugoslavia came that ultimately ended the war. Following the end of the war, he joined FC Prishtina, the club he had supported as a child, and he was eventually promoted to the first team in 2002 at the age of just 17.

Senior career
He joined newly promoted Albanian Superliga side Bylis Ballsh on 21 August 2015 as a free agent.

In 2017, he joined KF Flamurtari.

International career
He made his debut for Kosovo in a May 2014 friendly match against Turkey and earned a total of 2 caps, scoring no goals. His other international game was a May 2014 friendly against Senegal.

References

External links

1983 births
Living people
Sportspeople from Pristina
Kosovo Albanians
Kosovan footballers
Kosovo international footballers
Association football goalkeepers
FC Prishtina players
KF Vëllaznimi players
FK Renova players
KF Bylis Ballsh players
KF Flamurtari players
KF Vushtrria players
Football Superleague of Kosovo players
Kategoria Superiore players
Kosovan expatriate footballers
Expatriate footballers in North Macedonia
Kosovan expatriate sportspeople in North Macedonia
Expatriate footballers in Albania
Kosovan expatriate sportspeople in Albania